Garzan Dam is an embankment dam on the Garzan River  northeast of Kozluk in Batman Province, Turkey. It is part of the Southeastern Anatolia Project and has a primary purpose of hydroelectric power generation and irrigation. Surveys for the dam were completed in 2008, construction began in 2009 and the dam began to impound its reservoir in October 2012. The power plant has an installed capacity of 49 MW. The irrigation works remain under construction and are expected to irrigate an area of  when complete. The dam was awarded to FERNAS Energy Electricity Generation Co. Inc. in 2011 under a build–operate–transfer basis.

References

External links

Dams in Batman Province
Rock-filled dams
Dams completed in 2012
Hydroelectric power stations in Turkey
Southeastern Anatolia Project
Dams in the Tigris River basin